Browns is an unincorporated community in Preble County, in the U.S. state of Ohio.

History
A former variant name was Brown's Station. Brown's Station was not officially platted. A post office called Browns Station was established in 1869, and remained in operation until 1874.

References

Unincorporated communities in Preble County, Ohio
Unincorporated communities in Ohio